Roti  is a 1942 Indian Hindi film directed by Mehboob Khan. The movie was anti-capitalist. This was Mehboob Khan's last movie before he set up his own production house.

Cast
 Chandramohan as Seth Laxmidas impostor	
 Sheikh Mukhtar as Balam
 Sitara as Kinari
 Akhtaribai Faizabadi as Darling
 Ashraf Khan as Commentator
 Qaimali 	
 Wasker
 Jamshedji
 Misra	
 Chobeji
 Nawab
 Aga Jani

Soundtrack
The film's soundtrack was composed by Anil Biswas with lyrics penned by Dr. Safdar Aah. Anil Biswas introduced Begum Akhtar as singer in this movie.

References

External links
 
 Roti (1942) on YouTube

1942 films
1940s Hindi-language films
Films directed by Mehboob Khan
Indian black-and-white films
Indian drama films
1942 drama films
Hindi-language drama films